Doniphan County (county code DP) is a county located in the U.S. state of Kansas. As of the 2020 census, the county population was 7,510. Its county seat is Troy, and its most populous city is Wathena.

History

Early history

For many millennia, the Great Plains of North America was inhabited by nomadic Native Americans.  From the 16th century to 18th century, the Kingdom of France claimed ownership of large parts of North America.  In 1762, after the French and Indian War, France secretly ceded New France to Spain, per the Treaty of Fontainebleau.

19th century
In 1802, Spain returned most of the land to France, but keeping title to about 7,500 square miles. In 1803, most of the land for modern day Kansas was acquired by the United States from France as part of the 828,000 square mile Louisiana Purchase for 2.83 cents per acre.

In 1854, the Kansas Territory was organized, then in 1861 Kansas became the 34th U.S. state. Doniphan County was established on August 25, 1855, then organized on September 18, 1855. It is named for the U.S. cavalry commander Colonel Alexander W. Doniphan (1808–1887) of Liberty, Missouri, who played an important part in the Mexican–American War. He was a zealous partisan in the failed effort made to extend slavery into Kansas.

Geography
Doniphan County is located in the northeastern corner of the state—it is bordered by Nebraska to the north and Missouri to the east. It is the third-smallest county in Kansas by land area and second-smallest by total area.

Geographic features
The Missouri River defines the border in the north and east.  Eight barge lines travel the river, and a Port Authority is located across the river in Saint Joseph, Missouri.  The river provides much of the water for the eastern part of the county.  Interior cities, such as Troy and Highland, receive their water from underground wells.  The Wolf River flows through western portions of the county and north into the Missouri River.

Major highways
The only major highway serving the county is U.S. Highway 36, an east–west route traveling through St. Joseph.  Troy, Elwood, and Wathena lie along this route.  Kansas state highways K-7, K-20, K-120, K-136, K-137, and K-238 serve other areas of the county.  K-7 has been designated a scenic byway.  (See the map below.)

Adjacent counties
 Holt County, Missouri (north)
 Andrew County, Missouri (northeast)
 Buchanan County, Missouri (southeast)
 Atchison County (southwest)
 Brown County (west)
 Richardson County, Nebraska (northwest)

Demographics

Doniphan County is part of the St. Joseph, MO-KS Metropolitan Statistical Area, which is also included in the Kansas City-Overland Park-Kansas City, MO-KS Combined Statistical Area.

2000 census
As of the 2000 census, there were 8,249 people, 3,173 households, and 2,183 families residing in the county. The population density was 21 people per square mile (8/km2). There were 3,489 housing units at an average density of 9 per square mile (3/km2). The racial makeup of the county was 94.85% White, 2.00% Black or African American, 1.21% Native American, 0.25% Asian, 0.40% from other races, and 1.29% from two or more races. Hispanic or Latino of any race were 1.16% of the population.

There were 3,173 households, out of which 32.60% had children under the age of 18 living with them, 56.40% were married couples living together, 8.70% had a female householder with no husband present, and 31.20% were non-families. 27.60% of all households were made up of individuals, and 14.20% had someone living alone who was 65 years of age or older. The average household size was 2.48 and the average family size was 3.03.

In the county, the population was spread out, with 25.30% under the age of 18, 11.80% from 18 to 24, 24.70% from 25 to 44, 22.00% from 45 to 64, and 16.20% who were 65 years of age or older. The median age was 37 years. For every 100 females, there were 98.60 males. For every 100 females age 18 and over, there were 96.20 males.

The median income for a household in the county was $32,537, and the median income for a family was $39,357. Males had a median income of $28,096 versus $19,721 for females. The per capita income for the county was $14,849. About 9.00% of families and 11.90% of the population were below the poverty line, including 13.30% of those under age 18 and 12.50% of those age 65 or over.

Government

County
Doniphan County is served by a Board of County Commissioners composed of one elected official from each of three districts. The commissioners serve four-year terms with the 2nd and 3rd district elections following two years after the 1st district election. The board is responsible for setting the county's policies, procedures, and budgets as well as overseeing functions of their respective road and bridge shops. In addition, the board acts as the Board of County Canvassers and canvasses votes cast at each election. The county has adopted comprehensive county planning and zoning codes. The cities are governed by mayors and city councils. Government services are paid for through a sales tax, property tax, and an ad valorem tax mill levy.

Presidential elections

Owing to its history of settlement by anti-slavery Yankees from Iowa and ultimately New England, Doniphan County became a Republican stronghold and has remained so ever since. The county has voted for the Republican nominee in every presidential election since Kansas became a state, beginning in 1864. With Riley County voting Democratic for the first time in the 2020 election, Doniphan County is the only county in Kansas that has never had at least a plurality for the Democratic nominee. Only on three occasions has the Democratic nominee reached forty percent of Doniphan County's vote, all of these in national landslides, and on only seven occasions have the Democrats managed 35 percent of county ballots.

Laws
Although the Kansas Constitution was amended in 1986 to allow the sale of alcoholic liquor by the individual drink with the approval of voters, Doniphan County remained a prohibition, or "dry", county until 2012.

Education

Unified school districts
 Doniphan West USD 111
 Riverside USD 114
 Troy USD 429

Colleges and universities
Highland Community College was the first college established in the state when the Highland University charter was granted by the Territorial Legislature in 1858.  Over time the college lost its affiliation with the Presbyterian Church and changed its name several times before becoming a regional rural community college. (Web site)

Communities

Cities

 Denton
 Elwood
 Highland
 Leona
 Severance
 Troy
 Wathena
 White Cloud

Census-designated place
 Bendena

Other unincorporated communities

 Blair
 Brenner
 Doniphan
 Fanning
 Iowa Point
 Moray
 Palermo
 Purcell
 Sparks

Townships
Doniphan County is divided into nine mostly rural townships.  The three townships with the greatest population lie along U.S. Highway 36.  None of the cities within the county are considered governmentally independent, and all figures for the township include those of the cities.  In the following table, the population center is the largest city (or cities) included in that township's population total, if it is of a significant size.

Points of interest
Native American Heritage Museum, 2 miles east of Highland : Originally a Presbyterian Mission built in 1845 to educate Iowa and Missouri Sac and Fox children, the museum was rehabilitated to showcase the arts and history of the emigrant tribes in northeastern Kansas. (Web site)
Nelson Rodgers House, in Troy : Built in 1856, this -story center-gable house constructed of hand-hewn timbers is the first and oldest remaining house in Troy.
Four-state Lookout, in White Cloud : This viewing platform provides a panoramic view of the Missouri River valley, including Kansas, Missouri, Nebraska, and (possibly) Iowa.
Townsite of Old Doniphan : On July 4, 1804, the Lewis and Clark Expedition camped near an uninhabited Kanza Indian village on Independence Creek.  The former town of Doniphan was established in the vicinity of the campsite.

See also
 Dry counties
 National Register of Historic Places listings in Doniphan County, Kansas

References

Further reading

 Gray's Doniphan County History: A Record of the Happenings of Half a Hundred Years; P.L. Gray; Roycroft Press; 173 pages; 1905.
 Standard Atlas of Doniphan County, Kansas; North West Publishing Co; 38 pages; 1904.
 Historical Plat Book of Doniphan County, Kansas; J.S. Bird; 98 pages; 1882.

External links

County
 
 Doniphan County - Directory of Public Officials
Additional information
 Lewis & Clark in Kansas: Doniphan County Attractions
 Doniphan County 1882 Historical Plat Book
 County Level Data from Kansas Statistical Abstract
 Kansas State Historical Society
General county information
 The Political Graveyard
 List of extinct towns and post offices
Maps
 Doniphan County Maps: Current, Historic, KDOT
 Kansas Highway Maps: Current, Historic, KDOT
 Kansas Railroad Maps: Current, 1996, 1915, KDOT and Kansas Historical Society

 
Kansas counties
1855 establishments in Kansas Territory
St. Joseph, Missouri metropolitan area
Kansas counties on the Missouri River